Benoît Chagnaud (born 21 August 1972) is a French former football forward.

References

Living people
1972 births
Association football forwards
French footballers
Évreux FC 27 players
Le Havre AC players
AS Beauvais Oise players
Amiens SC players
Le Mans FC players
Grenoble Foot 38 players
Entente SSG players
Arras FA players
Ligue 1 players
Ligue 2 players